

September 2016

References 

 09
September 2016 events in the United States